Yellowjackets is an American jazz fusion band founded in 1977 in Los Angeles, California.

History

In 1977, guitarist Robben Ford, for his first solo album, recruited keyboardist Russell Ferrante, electric bassist Jimmy Haslip and drummer Ricky Lawson. They decided to continue as a group and were signed to Warner Bros. Records by producer Tommy LiPuma, who chose the name "Yellowjackets" from a list of potential group names the band had compiled.

In 1984, the band's second album, Mirage a Trois, was nominated for a Grammy Award for Best Fusion Performance. Ford only played on half this album, and after he departed the group, saxophonist Marc Russo was hired in his place. The next album, Shades, reached No. 4 on the Billboard magazine jazz album chart, while the single "And You Know That" won a Grammy for Best R&B Instrumental Performance. Lawson left and was replaced by Will Kennedy in 1987. Their next three albums, Four Corners, Politics, and The Spin all received Grammy nominations for Best Jazz Fusion Performance. With Russo leaving the band in 1990, Bob Mintzer replaced him for the album Greenhouse, which reached No. 1 on the Billboard Contemporary Jazz Album chart. Mintzer has remained a band member. 

The Yellowjackets celebrated their 30th anniversary in 2011 with the album Timeline for Mack Avenue. When Haslip took an extended hiatus, he was replaced by Felix Pastorius (son of bassist Jaco Pastorius.) The band released A Rise in the Road with Pastorius. On some of the songs, Pastorius played the fretless bass guitar made famous by his father.

In addition to their studio albums, the Yellowjackets contributed two tracks to the soundtrack of the film Star Trek IV: The Voyage Home in 1986.

Awards and honors
Grammy Awards
 R&B Instrumental Performance: "And You Know That" (1987)
 Jazz Fusion Performance: Politics (1989)

Grammy nominations
 Jazz Fusion Performance: Mirage a Trois (1984), Four Corners (1987)
 Contemporary Jazz Performance: Greenhouse (1992), Like a River (1994), Run for Your Life (1995), Dreamland (1996), Club Nocturne (1999)
 Contemporary Jazz Album: Mint Jam (2003), Time Squared (2004), Lifecycle (2009)
 Jazz Instrumental Performance: The Spin (1990)
 Instrumental Composition: "Claire's Closet", Russell Ferrante (2009), "Civil War", Bob Mintzer (2014)

Discography 
1981: Yellowjackets (Warner Bros.)
1983: Mirage a Trois  (Warner Bros.)
1985: Samurai Samba (Warner Bros.)
1986: Shades (GRP)
1987: Four Corners (GRP)
1988: Politics (MCA)
1989: The Spin (MCA)
1991: Greenhouse (MCA)
1992: Live Wires (GRP)
1993: Like a River (GRP)
1994: Run for Your Life (GRP)
1995: Dreamland (Warner Bros.)
1995: Bobby McFerrin's Bang!Zoom (Blue Note)
1997: Blue Hats (Warner Bros.)
1998: Club Nocturne (Warner Bros.)
2001: Mint Jam (Heads Up)
2003: Time Squared (Heads Up)
2003: Peace Round: A Christmas Celebration (Heads Up)
2005: Altered State (Heads Up)
2006: Twenty-Five (Heads Up)
2008: Lifecycle  (Heads Up)
2011: Timeline (Mack Avenue)
2013: A Rise in the Road (Mack Avenue)
2016: Cohearence (Mack Avenue)
2018: Raising Our Voice (Mack Avenue)
2020: Jackets XL (Mack Avenue)
2022: Parallel Motion (Mack Avenue)

Members

Present lineup
Russell Ferrante – keyboards, synthesizers (1977–present)
Bob Mintzer – saxophones, bass clarinet, EWI (1991–present)
William Kennedy – drums, percussion (1987–1999, 2010–present)
Dane Alderson – bass (2015–present)

Former members
Robben Ford – guitar (1977–1983)
Jimmy Haslip – bass (1977–2012)
Mike Miller – guitar (1983)
Ricky Lawson – drums (1977–1987; died 2013)
Michael Landau – guitar (1985)
Marc Russo – saxophones (1985–1989)
Peter Erskine – drums (1999-2000)
Terri Lyne Carrington – drums (2000)
Marcus Baylor – drums (2000–2010)
Felix Pastorius – bass (2012–2015)

Timeline

See also
Jazz fusion
List of jazz fusion musicians

References

External links

 Official site

American jazz ensembles from California
Jazz fusion ensembles
Jazz musicians from California
Musical groups established in 1977
Musical groups from Los Angeles
Smooth jazz ensembles
Grammy Award winners
GRP Records artists
MCA Records artists
Warner Records artists
Articles which contain graphical timelines
Mack Avenue Records artists